Thériault is a surname. Notable people with the surname include:

Bernard Thériault (born 1955), Canadian politician
Camille Thériault (born 1955), Canadian politician, former premier of New Brunswick
Charles Theriault, Maine politician
Denis Thériault (born 1959), Canadian writer
Edward Joseph Thériault (1901–1968), Liberal party member of the Senate of Canada
Élisée Thériault (1884–1958), lawyer and political figure in Quebec
Éric Thériault (born 1967), Canadian cartoonist
Gérard Charles Édouard Thériault (1932–1998), Canadian Chief of Defense Staff
Harold Theriault, Canadian politician
Janine Theriault (born 1975), Canadian actress
Jean-Yves Thériault, bassist from Canadian metal group Voivod
Jean-Yves Thériault (kickboxer) (born 1955), Canadian kickboxer
John Theriault (born 1960), Australian curler
Lévite Thériault (1837–1896), landowner and political figure in New Brunswick
Lise Thériault (born 1966), Quebec politician
Lyn Thériault, formerly known as Lyn Faust, politician in Montreal, Quebec, Canada
Mathieu Corbeil-Thériault (born 1991), Canadian ice hockey goaltender
Milaine Thériault (born 1973), Canadian skier
Nicole Theriault (born 1972), Thai singer and actress
Norbert Thériault (born 1921), Canadian politician
Paul Thériault, Canadian politician, former leader of the Yukon Liberal Party
Roch Thériault (1947–2011), Canadian religious leader
Sean Theriault, American professor
Serge Thériault (born 1948), Quebec comedian and actor
Yves Thériault (1915–1983), Canadian author

Other uses
 École Secondaire catholique Thériault, Canadian high school in Timmins, Ontario
 A. F. Theriault Shipyard, a ship yard and boatbuilder in Meteghan River, Nova Scotia